James Power was an Irish Gaelic footballer who played as a centre-forward for the Cork senior team.

Power made his first appearance for the team during the 1889 championship and was a regular member of the starting fifteen for the next two seasons. During that time he won one All-Ireland medal and one Munster medal. In 1890 Power captained the team to the All-Ireland title. 

At club level Power was a double county championship medalist with Midleton.

References

 

Midleton Gaelic footballers
Cork inter-county Gaelic footballers
Winners of one All-Ireland medal (Gaelic football)
Year of birth missing
Year of death missing